Fumitaka is a Japanese masculine given name. Notable people with the name include:

, eldest son of Prime Minister Fumimaro Konoe
, Japanese boxer
, Japanese baseball player

Japanese masculine given names